Halal literally means "permissible" in Arabic and refers to goods, including food items and services that are permissible to be consumed or availed under Sharia law, whereas  (lit. "unlawful") refers to goods that are forbidden to be consumed or availed. The Philippines despite being a Christian-majority country has a state-sanctioned program to facilitate halal certification of goods under the Halal Act of 2016.

Background
The Philippines is a Christian-majority country although there are state-led efforts to develop the halal certification process in the country, for numerous purposes such as international trade and as means to encourage more halal tourism by providing more dining options for Muslim tourists. As of 2018, the Philippines only contributes 5 percent to the global halal industry trade according to its Department of Trade and Industry (DTI). The Philippine government is seeking to expand and develop the halal certification process in the country in order to develop its export industry with Muslim-majority countries. The government has also promoted halal-certified food items to non-Muslims since halal food items are free from alcohol, pork, and pork-derived products

Halal Act of 2016
There is national legislation which mandates the government to regulate halal certification of goods in the Philippines as well as the promotion of halal-certified goods for export, which is known as the Philippine Halal Export Development and Promotion Program Act of 2016 (Republic Act 10817). The law took into effect on July 26, 2017 after its implementing rules and regulations was approved.

The law established the Halal Export Development and Promotion Board, an inter-agency body led by the Department of Trade and Industry along with the National Commission on Muslim Filipinos, the Departments of Agriculture, Department of Health, Department of Foreign Affairs, Department of Tourism, Department of Science and Technology, the Bangko Sentral ng Pilipinas (the country's central bank), and the Mindanao Development Authority, along with two Muslim Filipino professionals to facilitate its implementation.

Prior to the passage of the Halal Act of 2016, the National Commission on Muslim Filipinos (NCMF) is already mandated under Republic Act 9997 of 2010 to develop the halal industry as well as to accredit halal certifying bodies. The NCMF itself replaced the defunct Office on Muslim Affairs.

Halal certification

Bodies
The DTI's Philippine Accreditation Bureau (PAB) is the sole agency which deals with the accreditation of halal-certification bodies, inspection bodies and testing and calibration laboratories. The PAB is the representative organization for the Philippines in the International Halal Accreditation Forum since 2017. The Department of Science and Technology has set up a network of one-stop laboratories dubbed as OneLab which also conduct halal testing.As of 2020, there are nine halal-certification bodies (HCBs) in the Philippines namely:

Islamic Da'wah Council of the Philippines
Halal Development Institute of the Philippines
Mindanao Halal Authority
Muslim Mindanao Halal Certification Board
Halal International Chamber of Commerce and Industries in the Philippines
Islamic Advocate on Halal and Development
Philippine Ulama Congress Organization inc
Alliance for Halal Integrity in the Philippines
Prime Certification and Inspection Asia Pacific

HCBs can also certify non-food items such as cosmetics, pharmaceutical products including vaccines.

Mark
The Philippine government adopted a national Halal logo or mark in July 2019 to identify halal-certified products produced in the country. There are two versions of the mark; one which is in monochrome for labeling purposes as a means to reduce printing cost, and a full-color version used for other printing materials. Halal-certification bodies also has their own halal logos, which was still authorized to be used even after the adoption of the 2019 national halal logo.

See also
Sharia in the Philippines

References

External links
Republic Act No. 10817 at the Department of Agriculture website.

Philippines
Islam in the Philippines
Food and drink in the Philippines